The disparate angelshark (Squatina heteroptera) is a species of angelshark. Heteroptera in its name refers to the difference in size, shape and area of the two dorsal fins. Disparate angelsharks have the typical angel shark body form that is broadly flattened with large pectoral/pelvic fins and eyes and spiracles on the top of their heads. Their common and species name comes from them having dorsal fins of very different sizes, shapes, and areas compared to other angel sharks.

Disparate angelsharks are usually dark brown on top (dorsal surface) without any thorns or eyespots (ocelli) though they do have two distinct round black spots on the upper edge of their pectoral fins and irregular, scattered whitish spots.

References

disparate angelshark
Fish of Mexico
Fish of the Gulf of California
disparate angelshark
Taxobox binomials not recognized by IUCN